Republic of Safety was a Canadian indie rock band from Toronto, Ontario, known for including political content in their performances and recordings.

History
Republic of Safety was formed in 2005. The original members were vocalist Maggie MacDonald, guitarist Jonny Dovercourt, bassists Kat Gligorijevic and Kate McGee and drummer Evan Davies.  The final lineup featured MacDonald and Dovercourt with Marlena Kaesler, a vocalist, bass and guitar player from Caledonia, Ontario, Steve Sidoli (drums) and Martin Eckart (saxophone).

The band's first EP, Passport, was released on Sonic Unyon Records in 2005, and their follow-up release, Vacation came out on Ta Da! Records in 2006.  The latter release included guest appearances by Owen Pallett and Reg Vermue, and was produced by Don Pyle. Both EPs received airplay on Canadian campus radio and CBC Radio 3.

Citing creative differences and day jobs, the band ended as of early 2008. Their final gig on January 26, 2008 also doubled as a release for their third and final EP entitled Succession.

Band members
Maggie MacDonald
Kat Gligorijevic
Kate McGee
Evan Davies
Jonny Dovercourt
Marlena Kaesler
Martin Eckart

Discography

EPs
 Passport (2005)
 Vacation (2006)
 Succession (2008)

References

External links 
 https://web.archive.org/web/20051229093119/http://www.republicofsafety.ca/
 Article on break-up/final gig/EP

Musical groups established in 2005
Musical groups disestablished in 2008
Canadian indie rock groups
Musical groups from Toronto
2005 establishments in Ontario
2008 disestablishments in Ontario